Vontier Corporation is a manufacturing company headquartered in Raleigh, North Carolina. It owns the brands Gilbarco Veeder-Root, Matco Tools and Teletrac Navman, including subsidiaries Hennessy Industries, Gasboy, and Global Traffic Technologies (GTT).

History
In October 2020, Fortive completed the corporate spin-off of 80% of Vontier. Fortive disposed of its remaining 20% ownership interest in January 2021.

References

External links
 

American companies established in 2020
Companies based in Raleigh, North Carolina
Technology companies established in 2020
Companies listed on the New York Stock Exchange
Corporate spin-offs
2020 establishments in North Carolina